Kahnuiyeh or Kahnuyeh or Kahnowyeh may refer to:
 Kahnuyeh, Khonj, Fars Province
 Kahnuyeh, Lamerd, Fars Province
 Kahnuiyeh, Isfahan